Dan Henry Watches is a microbrand wristwatch manufacturer.  The company is notable within the wristwatch industry for creating vintage inspired affordable watches.

The company was founded in 2016 by Dan Henry, a watch collector with more than 1,500 vintage timepieces in his collection. Henry also runs an interactive website called Timeline.Watch, providing information on vintage watches.

Products 

In September 2016, Henry released his first line of watches: four models that Sofrep.com said "pay homage to the vintage styles of the 1930s, 1940s, 1960s and 1970s."

See also
List of watch manufacturers

References

External links

 Timeline.Watch: Official Website

American companies established in 2016
Watch manufacturing companies of the United States